Caishan is a town under the administration of Huangmei County, Hubei, China. , it administers Caiyun Residential Community and the following 54 villages:
Caishan Village 
Hushibo Village
Husifang Village
Huxiawu Village
Zhulinwo Village
Gaoshidun Village
Huangxi Village
Zhulin Village
Liuji Village
Zhangxing Village
Caoba Village
Zhoushangwu Village
Zhangba Village
Liying Village
Bahaojiao Village
Miaowan Village
Yihaozhou Village
Zhangwan Village
Shangxindun Village
Xiaxindun Village
Erhaozhou Village
Hujiadun Village
Xuyuetang Village
Wangdunzhai Village
Xiangjiaqiao Village
Meixuetang Village
Xujiawan Village
Wangtaiming Village
Hujiaqiao Village
Tuxiu Village
Huangnitang Village
Meitailiu Village
Meiwu'er Village
Chenjiadun Village
Chenhao Village
Wangsandun Village
Niefujun Village
Liliufang Village
Sigualü Village
Liuhu Village
Yangshiying Village
Dongbao Village
Zhouyingxiang Village
Shujiabu Village
Wangshangwu Village
Jimadun Village
Meijidi Village
Feidadun Village
Lanqiao Village
Tianbao Village
Zhangwanggui Village
Hujiaoxia Village
Wang'erfang Village
Baishendun Village

References 

Township-level divisions of Hubei
Huangmei County